This is a list of animated television series first aired in 2020.

See also
2020 in animation
2020 in anime
List of animated feature films of 2020

References

2020s animated television series
2020
Television series
2020-related lists